"If Nobody Believed in You" is  a song written by Harley Allen and recorded by American country music artist Joe Nichols.  It was released in March 2004 as the first single from his 2004 album Revelation. The song peaked at number 10 on the U.S. Billboard Hot Country Songs chart.

Content
The first two verses deal with the emotional harm insensitive people cause others, the third references those who try to keep religion out of public schools. "I believe that people have to have a belief in something," Nichols says, "whether it be God or whatever their religion. ... I think people get into a political war over simple words, and they miss the forest for the trees. ... The premise of the song is that we all need to believe in something -- in each other and, especially, God. It's just our opinion. We didn't mean to get too political or anything like that or make a podium out of the song. Some people aren't going to agree with us, but that's OK, too."

Music video
The music video was directed by Trey Fanjoy and premiered in June 2004.

Chart performance
"If Nobody Believed in You" debuted at number 60 on the U.S. Billboard Hot Country Singles & Tracks for the week of March 27, 2004.

Year-end charts

References

2004 singles
Joe Nichols songs
Songs written by Harley Allen
Music videos directed by Trey Fanjoy
Show Dog-Universal Music singles
Song recordings produced by Brent Rowan
2004 songs